Stephen Christopher Saenz Villarreal (born 23 August 1990 in McAllen, Texas, United States) is a Mexican athlete. Although born in the United States, he represents the Athletics Association of the State of Sonora (Asociación de Atletismo del Estado de Sonora).   He has competed for Mexico in shot put at the 2012 Summer Olympics. He was also an assistant track coach at Skyline High School in Ann Arbor, Michigan.

Personal bests

Achievements

References

External links

Sports reference biography
Tilastopaja biography

1990 births
Living people
Sportspeople from Sonora
People from McAllen, Texas
Mexican male shot putters
Olympic athletes of Mexico
Athletes (track and field) at the 2012 Summer Olympics
Athletes (track and field) at the 2011 Pan American Games
Athletes (track and field) at the 2015 Pan American Games
Central American and Caribbean Games medalists in athletics
Competitors at the 2014 Central American and Caribbean Games
Central American and Caribbean Games silver medalists for Mexico
Pan American Games competitors for Mexico
Track and field athletes from Texas